Jasol Chemical Products was a chemicals manufacturing company founded in Adelaide, South Australia by Charles George Johnson in 1934. It was well known in that state and Western Australia for its cleaning products and disinfectants, notably Jasol B. The brand is now owned by George Weston Foods. The name "Jasol" was an acronym of "Johnson's Antiseptic Soluble Oils Limited".

History
C. G. Johnson founded Jasol Chemical Products Ltd. in August 1934 with 2,000 shares of £1 each divided among five shareholders, the others being Millie Johnson, E.G. Lawton, F.G. Lawton and F.E.G. Edwards. The registered office was in Flinders Street, Adelaide. Head office in 1934 was at 57 Gawler Place, with a warehouse at 19 California St. Other premises occupied at various times were ANA Building in 1937 and Epworth Building in 1949.

At the outset much of the delivery was done by Johnson on a pushbike. Most sales were through the wholesalers Bickfords and Fauldings.

A warehouse facility was set up in Flinders Street in 1936, then moved to 33 Pirie Street in 1942, which remained its head office until at least 1962. In 1960, a greatly enlarged facility was set up in Willcox Ave, Prospect.

In 1971, the company was purchased by F. H. Faulding & Co.

In 1986, the brand was purchased by George Weston Foods. Manufacturing was transferred to Western Australia in 1991.

Products
Jasol B antiseptic 1934
Jasol A "Safer than lysol" (recommended uses included haemorrhoids, sunburn, feminine hygiene)
Johnson's stomach powder
Ex-Termin-All (DDT powder)
Jasol DDT spray (with pyrethrum)
The following products are mentioned in the GWF website as being produced around 1936:
Pine Oda
Johnson's Catarrh Balm
Jasol C & C (for Caretakers and Cleaners)
Holdfast denture cement

References

Pharmaceutical companies of Australia
Chemical companies established in 1934
Manufacturing companies based in Adelaide
Chemical companies of Australia
History of Adelaide
Australian companies established in 1934